The 2010 season was the 105th season of competitive football in Norway.

Men's football

League season

Tippeligaen

1. divisjon

2. divisjon

3. divisjon

Cup competitions

Norwegian Cup

Final

Superfinalen

Women's football

League season

Toppserien

1. divisjon

Norwegian Women's Cup

Final
 Røa 7–0 Trondheims-Ørn

Men's UEFA competitions

Champions League

Qualifying phase

Second qualifying round

|}

Third qualifying round

|}

Play-off round

|}

UEFA Europa League

Qualifying phase

Second qualifying round

|}

Third qualifying round

|}

Group stage

Group B

UEFA Women's Champions League

Knockout stage

Round of 32

|}

Round of 16

|}

National teams

Norway men's national football team

UEFA Euro 2012 qualifying

Group H

Fixtures and results

Key
 H = Home match
 A = Away match
 N = Neutral ground

Norway women's national football team

Notes and references

 
Seasons in Norwegian football